Love Between the Lines is the title of the seventh solo album by the Christian singer-songwriter Paul Field.

Track listing

Side one
 "Love Between the Lines" (Paul Field/Dave Cooke)
 "Dancing With Your Shadow" (Paul Field)
 "Strangers at Midnight" (Paul Field)
 "Jerusalem" (Paul Field)
 "The Dream" (Paul Field)

Side two
 "Time and Time Again" (Paul Field)
 "Suspicious Nature" (Paul Field)
 "State of Heart" (Paul Field)
 "Shoot the Wounded" (Annie McCaig)
 "For the World" (Paul Field)

Personnel
Paul Field: vocals, guitar, production
Dave Cooke: all instruments, production, mixing
Annie McCaig: vocals
John Clark: guitar

Production notes
Produced by Paul Field and Dave Cooke
Engineered by Paul Field and Dave Cooke
Recorded at Smithaw

1988 albums
Paul Field (Christian singer) albums